Somogyi is a Hungarian surname. Notable people with the surname include:

Csaba Somogyi (born 1985), a Hungarian football player
Ervin V. Somogyi (born 1944), pioneer of steel string guitar making
Ferenc Somogyi (born 1945), Hungarian Ambassador to the United States
Jennie Somogyi, American retired ballet dancer, former New York City Ballet principal dancer
József Somogyi (born May 23, 1968), Hungarian football player
László Somogyi (1907–1988), Hungarian conductor
Michael Somogyi (1883–1971), professor of biochemistry at Washington University who discovered the Somogyi effect of insulin overdosage
Zoltan Somogyi, senior lecturer at the University of Melbourne's Department of Computer and Information Systems

See also 
Chronic Somogyi rebound, the Somogyi effect of insulin overdosage

Hungarian-language surnames
Jewish surnames